A toter, or toter truck, is a tractor unit specifically designed for the modular and manufactured housing industries.

Characteristics
The toter is often confused or mistaken for a semi-trailer tractor. The key difference between the two is in the method of coupling. Toters are equipped with a 2-5/16" (59 mm) diameter ball that couples with the tow hitch on the tongue of a mobile or manufactured home or the removable transport frame of a modular home.

See also

 Heavy hauler

References

Tractors